Romantic Delicacies (simplified Chinese: 美食厨师男) is a Chinese drama, which was the 13th co-production of MediaCorp TV and ntv7. This drama serial consists of 25 episodes. In Singapore, it was telecasted on the free-to-air channel, MediaCorp Channel 8. It was screened from 31 August 2009 to 2 October 2009, on every weekday night at 7:00 pm.

Cast

Awards and nominations
Golden Awards
 Won: Best Actor (Melvin Sia)

Chinese-language drama television series in Malaysia
Singapore Chinese dramas
Singapore–Malaysia television co-productions
2009 Malaysian television series debuts
2009 Malaysian television series endings
2009 Singaporean television series debuts
2009 Singaporean television series endings
NTV7 original programming
Channel 8 (Singapore) original programming